Boulay-Moselle (Moselle Franconian: Bolchin) is a commune in the Moselle department in Grand Est in northeastern France. The locality of Halling-lès-Boulay (German: Hallingen) was incorporated in the commune in 1972. Until 2015, Boulay-Moselle was a subprefecture of the Moselle department.

Population

See also
 Camp du Ban-Saint-Jean
 Communes of the Moselle department

References

External links
 

Communes of Moselle (department)
Duchy of Lorraine